Satan is an album by saxophonist Sonny Stitt recorded in 1974 and released on the Cadet label.

Track listing 
All compositions by Roland Hanna except as indicated
 "Satan" (Jon Lucien) - 4:13    
 "A Crazy Mixed Up World" - 3:45    
 "Big Bad Henry" - 6:31    
 "Gee, Baby, Ain't I Good to You"  (Andy Razaf, Don Redman) - 1:53    
 "Will You Love Me Tomorrow" (Gerry Goffin, Carole King) - 5:50    
 "Anone" - 6:48    
 "It Might as Well Be Spring" (Oscar Hammerstein II, Richard Rodgers) - 4:50

Personnel 
Sonny Stitt - alto saxophone
Roland Hanna - electric piano (tracks 1-3, 5 & 6)
Billy Butler (tracks 1 & 5), Elliott Randall (tracks 1, 3), John Tropea (track 3) - guitar 
Ron Carter - bass (tracks 4 & 7)
Richard Davis (tracks 3 & 6), Gordon Edwards (tracks 1 & 5) - electric bass
Jimmy Johnson - drums (tracks 1, 3, 5 & 6) 
Montego Joe (tracks 1 & 5), Norman Pride (tracks 3 & 6) - congas
Kermit Moore - cello (track 2)
Wade Marcus - arranger, conductor

References 

1974 albums
Cadet Records albums
Sonny Stitt albums
Albums produced by Esmond Edwards
Albums arranged by Wade Marcus